Siarhei Busel (born 30 May 1989) is a Belarusian volleyball player, a member of the club NOVA Novokuybyshevsk.

Sporting achievements

Clubs 
Belarus Cup:
  2009, 2010, 2012, 2013
Belarus Championship:
  2010, 2011, 2012, 2013, 2014

National Team 
European League:
  2019

References

External links
Volley profile
Volley Service profile
Volleybox profile
CEV profile

1989 births
Living people
Belarusian men's volleyball players
Sportspeople from Minsk